Fábio Oliveira may refer to:
Fábio Oliveira (footballer, born 1974), Brazilian footballer
Fábio Marcelo de Oliveira (born 1974), Brazilian footballer better known as Fabio
Fábio Noronha de Oliveira (born 1975) Brazilian footballer better known as Fábio Noronha
Fábio Pereira de Oliveira (born 1981), Brazilian footballer better known as Fábio Bala
Fábio Oliveira (footballer, born 1981), Togolese footballer
Fábio Oliveira (footballer, born 1993), Portuguese footballer
Fábio Oliveira (footballer, born 1994), Portuguese footballer